Mohamed Ahmed (Muhammad Ahmad) (July 2, 1917 – January 27, 1984) was a Comorian politician.

Biography 
He was born in Mutsamudu on the island of Anjouan. During the 1950s, he became one of the most important non-French political leaders in the Comoros, and served as vice-president of the government council from 1957 until 1962. After this he became less influential until after Comoros became an independent nation in 1975. Ahmed was a strong supporter of the May 1978 coup in which Ali Soilih was overthrown. He became a co-chairman of a directorate which took charge of the government, but lost this position in October 1978 as the other co-chairman, Ahmed Abdallah took complete power.

References 

1917 births
1984 deaths
Presidents of the Comoros
People from Anjouan